Život teče u laganom ritmu (Eng. The life is flowing in slow rhythm) is an album of  Zvonko Bogdan, Croatian/Bunjevac singer from Vojvodina, Serbia. It was released in 2001 on the Croatia Records record label.

Track listing
 "Prošle su mnoge ljubavi"
 "Život teče u laganom ritmu"
 "Od Konavala pa do Zagore"
 "Markova čežnja"
 "Ako si ti pupoljak od ruže"
 "Govori se da me varaš"
 "Fijaker stari"
 "Ljubio sam crno oko"
 "Kraj jezera jedna kuća mala"
 "Kopa cura vinograd"
 "Ančice plavčice"
 "A oj, jelo jelena"
 "Malo ja, malo ti"
 "Fatima"
 "Ima jedna sjetna pjesma"
 "Marijano, Marijano"
 "Otvori prozor"
 "Eh, da vrime rane liči"

Credits
 Zvonko Bogdan – vocals

Studijski tamburaški ansambl J. Grchevicha
 Jerry Grchevich – prim, basprim, čelo
 Damir Mihovec – basprim
 Denis Špegelj – basprim
 Darko Dervišević – bugarija
 Željko Miloš – berda

2001 albums
Zvonko Bogdan albums